Dolichoderus balticus is an extinct species of Eocene ant in the genus Dolichoderus. Described by Mayr in 1868, the fossils of a worker, queen and male of the species were discovered in the Baltic Amber.

References

†
Eocene insects
Prehistoric insects of Europe
Fossil taxa described in 1868
Fossil ant taxa